William Elderton may refer to:

William Elderton (ballad writer) (died 1592?), English actor and lawyer
William Palin Elderton (1877–1962), British actuary